The Elation Freedom is a bespoke sports car developed and manufactured by American California-based automobile manufacturer Elation Motors. Unveiled to the public in mid-November of 2020, it is the first car built by the brand.

Specifications 
The Freedom is powered an electric powertrain of either three or four electric motors, powered either by a 100kW or 120kW battery pack, with 1,414 and 1,903 hp,  respectively. The most powerful version of the Freedom, with the four electric-motor powertrain, is claimed to go from 0-60 mph in just 1.8 seconds, with a top speed of up than 260 mph and a top-range estimate of 400 miles on moderate driving. The electric powertrain has a two-speed automatic transmission at the rear axle, similar to that of the Porsche Taycan, only allowing one motor to drive when at lower speeds or when cruising on the highway.

Design 
The Freedom, along with its gas-powered twin, was designed with the intent to be a luxury hypercar. The electric powertrain for the Freedom will be supplied by Cascadia Motion, a unit of automotive supplier BorgWarner, which has also supplied electrics motors for Formula E and KERS systems for Formula One. The hardware for the Freedom hypercar will sit in a lightweight carbon-fiber monocoque structure, also featuring an F1-style pushrod suspension, with the overall low profile allowing for a low drag coefficient of 0.28 Cd.

Unveiling and production 
The Freedom, along with its gas-powered twin, will first be unveiled at the 2022 Geneva International Motor Show, and production will begin after the debut if there is enough demand, building no more than 25 examples each year, each priced at $2 million.

References

External links 
 https://elationhypercars.com/freedom

Electric sports cars
Electric car models
Luxury vehicles
2020s cars
Cars of the United States